AFWL may refer to:

 Alberta Footy Women's League, Australian football league
 American Football Women's League, American football league
 AFWL UAV, Chinese unmanned helicopter